The Houston Rockets are an American professional basketball team based in Houston, Texas. The Rockets play in the Southwest Division of the Western Conference in the National Basketball Association (NBA). The team was established in 1967, and played in San Diego, California for four years, before moving to Houston, Texas.

In the Rockets' debut season, their win–loss record was 15–67. After drafting Elvin Hayes first overall in the 1968 NBA Draft, they made their first appearance in the playoffs in 1969. After Hayes was traded, Moses Malone replaced him. Malone won two Most Valuable Player awards during his time in Houston, and led the Rockets to the  Eastern Conference finals in his first year with the Rockets. He also led the Rockets to the NBA Finals in 1981, but they were defeated in six games by the Boston Celtics. Two years after advancing to the finals, the Rockets won a franchise-low 14 games.

In 1984, the Rockets drafted future Hall-of-Famer Hakeem Olajuwon, who led them to the 1986 Finals in his second year, in which they lost again to Boston. In the next seven seasons, they lost in the first round of the playoffs five times. They did not win their first championship until , when Olajuwon led them to a franchise-best 58 wins, and the championship. They did not advance past the first round of the playoffs for 13 years, until the 2008–09 NBA season. The 2017–18 Rockets made franchise history by becoming the first Houston team ever to win 60 or more games in a regular season, finishing at 65–17.

The Rockets have played 54 seasons, and advanced to the playoffs in 34 of those seasons. They also have regular season records of .500 or better in 38 of their 54 seasons, placing them well into the upper third of NBA franchises in overall win–loss records. They have won eight division titles, and have been conference champions four times. Their overall record is 2,444 wins and 2,328 losses.

Table key

Seasons

All-time records
Complete through the 2021–22 regular season

Notes

References
General

Specific

Houston Rockets seasons
seasons